Belinda Jones may refer to:

 Belinda Jones (writer) (born 1967), British writer
 Belinda Jones (pianist), British pianist